The 7th Biathlon World Championships were held in 1966 in Garmisch-Partenkirchen, in the then West Germany. The men's relay event was given official recognition.

Men's results

20 km individual

4 × 7.5 km relay

Medal table

References

1966
Biathlon World Championships
International sports competitions hosted by West Germany
1966 in West German sport
February 1966 sports events in Europe
1960s in Bavaria
Sport in Garmisch-Partenkirchen
Biathlon competitions in West Germany
Sports competitions in Bavaria